The Susquehannock people, also called the Conestoga by some English settlers or Andastes were Iroquoian Native Americans who lived in areas adjacent to the Susquehanna River and its tributaries, ranging from its upper reaches in the southern part of what is now New York (near the lands of the Five Nations of the Iroquois Confederacy), through eastern and central Pennsylvania west of the Poconos and the upper Delaware River (near the lands of the Lenape), with lands extending beyond the mouth of the Susquehanna in Maryland along the west bank of the Potomac at the north end of the Chesapeake Bay.

Evidence of their habitation has also been found in northern West Virginia and portions of southwestern Pennsylvania, which could be reached via the gaps of the Allegheny or several counties to the south, via the Cumberland Narrows pass which held the Nemacolin Trail. In fact, after the Susquehannock had been destroyed by the Iroquois, the Iroquois claimed the western reaches of the Potomac River Valley on the behalf of the Conestoga to Pennsylvania  and politically thwarted repeated attempts by European settlers to pass through or settle in the region, until they gave up the land to the English via the Treaty of Albany in 1722. Both passes abutted their range and could be reached through connecting valleys from the West Branch Susquehanna and their large settlement at Conestoga, Pennsylvania.

Language

The Susquehannock are an Iroquoian-speaking people. Little of the Susquehannock language has been preserved in published print. The chief source is a Vocabula Mahakuassica compiled by the Swedish missionary Johannes Campanius during the 1640s. Campanius' vocabulary contains about 100 words and is sufficient to show that Susquehannock is a Northern Iroquoian language, closely related to those of the Iroquois Confederacy. The language of the Susquehannock appears to have been closely related to that of the Onondaga Nation. It is considered extinct as of 1763, when the last survivors were killed at Conestoga by the Paxton Boys. A couple were elsewhere and lived to natural deaths.

Names 
The Europeans who explored the interior of the east coast of North America usually learned the names of the interior nations from the coastal Algonquian-speaking peoples whom they first encountered. The Europeans adapted and transliterated these coastal exonyms to fit their own languages and spelling systems, and tried to capture the sounds of the names. No Susquehannock endonyms survive.

 The Huron, another Iroquoian-speaking people, called these people Andastoerrhonon, meaning "people of the blackened ridge pole", related to their building practices. The French adapted the Huron term and called them Andaste or Gandastogue ("people of the blackened ridge pole").
 The Lenape, an Algonquian-speaking people, referred to them by an exonym, Mengwe. An anonymous Lenâpe-English dictionary published in 1888 said this literally means "glans penis". Wallace gives "treacherous" as the translation of Minquas. Dutch and Swedish colonists derived their term of Minquas for the people from this term.
 The Powhatan-speaking peoples of coastal Virginia (also Algonquian) called the tribe the Sasquesahanough. The English settlers in Maryland and Virginia transliterated the Powhatan term, referring to the people as the Susquehannock.
 In the late eighteenth century, British colonists in Pennsylvania called them the Conestoga, derived from a remaining village known as Conestoga Town. Its name was based on the Iroquoian term, Kanastoge, possibly meaning "place of the upright pole." Early English and Dutch traders heard and spelled the people's main settlement, fort, or castle, as "Quanestaqua."

History

Before European contact
According to Minderhout, around 1450 the Susquehannock were living on the North Branch of the Susquehanna River. They moved downriver to present-day Lancaster County by 1525, where they lived in denser villages.

The Susquehannock told Europeans that they originally came from a large river valley to the west. Europeans who wrote this down seemed to assume that the Mississippi River was meant, although no Iroquoian people have ever been found in the archaeological records of the region. The Iroquois, themselves, passed down in their own oral history that the Susquehannock evolved out of two different groups of Iroquoian peoples- the first were descended from the Mohawks and conquered their way straight south from Mohawk territory and are likely also the ancestors of the Nottoway, Meherrin, Tuscarora and Cherokee. The second group broke away from the Erie people of present-day northwest Pennsylvania, crossed the Allegheny River and began conquering their way south. The Iroquois had many different names for the Ohio River, despite the one which became its namesake, and some of those are also applied to the Mississippi River, which could explain the confusion. The Susquehannocks, themselves, also attempted to explain the existence of "White Minqua" and "Black Minqua," all Susquehannocks, but different in ways not mentioned when the terms are brought up. All of this would suggest the veracity of the Iroquoian oral history claims.

Modern estimates of the total Susquehannock population in 1600 range as high as 7,000 people. During the sixteenth century and carrying forward into the first decades of colonization, the Susquehannock were the most numerous people in what is now called the Susquehanna Valley. It is likely that the Susquehannock had occupied the same lands for several thousand years.

European Contact

English colonists seldom visited the upper Susquehanna during the early colonial period. When John Smith met the Susquehannock in 1608, they had a large town in the lower river valley at present-day Washington Boro, Pennsylvania. Smith wrote of the Susquehannock, 
"They can make neere 600 able and mighty men, and are pallisadoed [palisaded] in their Townes to defend them from the Massawomekes, their mortal enemies." He was astonished to find the Susquehannock were brokering trade with French goods. He estimated the population of their village to be 2,000, although he never visited it.

Similar to the Haudenosaunee, or Iroquois Confederacy, the Susquehannock consisted of several distinct tribes. Capital towns were named by John Smith as: 
 Sasquesahanough (on the east side of the Susquehanna near Conewago Falls), 
 Attaock (on the west side of the Susquehanna likely in present-day York County, Pennsylvania), 
 Quadroque (in present-day Northumberland County, Pennsylvania), 
 Tesinigh (on the east bank of the Susquehanna in present-day Lancaster County, Pennsylvania), 
 Utchowig, and 
 Cepowig (likely in present-day York County, Pennsylvania "on the east side of the main stream of Willowbye's river").

The French explorer Samuel Champlain noted the Susquehannock in his Voyages of Samuel Champlain. Writing of a 1615 incident, he described a Susquehannock town, Carantouan, as "provided with more than eight hundred warriors, and strongly fortified, . . . [with] high and strong palisades well bound and joined together, the quarters being constructed in a similar fashion." Carantouan was located on the upper Susquehanna River near present-day Waverly, Tioga County, New York. Spanish Hill may be the former site of Carantouan.

Estimates of the historic population of the Susquehannock are uncertain due to their lack of contact with the Europeans. The Europeans' best guesses were that the tribe numbered from 5,000 to 7,000 in 1600, and that the Susquehannock were a regional power capable of holding off the Haudenosaunee in the first seven decades of the 17th century, including after the Haudenosaunee began systematic warfare against neighboring ethnic groups to gain territory and power (including firearms) in fur trading. Before that time, the inland Susquehannock had allied with Dutch and Swedish traders (1600 & 1610) and Swedish settlers in New Sweden around 1640 who had a monopoly on European flintlock firearms, increasing the tribe's power. They did not supply such firearms to the Haudenosaunee or the Lenape after the English defeated the Dutch Because British traders had established relationships with the Haudenosaunee, they refused to sell firearms to the Lenape, who occupied a broad band of territory along the mid-Atlantic coast.

Prior to 1640, the Susquehannock may have defeated bands of the Lenape in the greater central Delaware Valley region, and made raids across the Delaware River into what is now central New Jersey. Following a war with the fierce Susquehannock before 1640, the Lenape became a tributary nation to them.
 
The Susquehannock (whose population had been greatly reduced by the time the British tried to assert any significant control over the Susquehannock homeland) had early on allied with the Swedes, who traded Dutch firearms for Susquehannock furs as early as the 1610s. At this point in time, the Susquehannock were generally opposed to the policies of the new European managers of the colonies of Maryland and Pennsylvania. Consequently, the Susquehannock defended themselves from attack in a war declared by the Province of Maryland from 1642 to the 1650s and won it, with help from their Swedish allies.

During the mid-17th century, the Susquehannock found that the English fur traders would trade European firearms in exchange for beaver skins. Due to the trade deals that the Susquehannock were getting from the English fur traders, the Haudenosaunee began warring against other Nations in the region in order to monopolize the richest fur-bearing streams. When the Haudenosaunee attempted to impose their will upon the Susquehannock circa 1666, the Susquehannock achieved a great victory against the combined forces of the Seneca and Cayuga nations, severely damaging the southern populations of both these western Iroquois nations.

Susquehannock authority reached a zenith in the early 1670s, after which they suffered an extremely rapid population and authority decline in the mid-1670s, – presumably from infectious diseases such as smallpox. These also decimated other Native American groups such as the Mohawk and other Iroquoian-speaking nations. By 1678, drastically weakened by their losses, the Susquehannock were overwhelmed by the Haudenosaunee. Some small groups are believed to have fled west via the gaps of the Allegheny into land beyond most European influence in the Ohio Country. Some likely were absorbed by the Shawnee. 

During the early Dutch colonization of New Netherland, the Susquehannock traded furs with the Europeans. As early as 1623, they struggled to go north past the Lenape, who occupied territory along the Delaware River, to trade with the Dutch at New Amsterdam. In 1634, the Susquehannock defeated the Lenape in that area, who may have become their tributaries.

In 1638, Swedish settlers established New Sweden in the Delaware Valley near the coast. Their location near the bay enabled them to interrupt the Susquehannock fur trade with the Dutch further north along the coast.

In 1642, the English colony of Maryland declared war on the Susquehannock. With the help of Swedish colonists, the Susquehannock defeated the colony of Maryland in 1644. Maryland was in an intermittent state of war with the Susquehannock until 1652. As a result, the Susquehannock traded almost exclusively with New Sweden to the north.

Alliance with Maryland, 1651–1674

In 1652, six chiefs of the Susquehannock concluded a peace treaty with Maryland. In return for arms and safety on their southern flank, they ceded to Maryland large territories on both shores of the Chesapeake Bay. This decision was also related to the Beaver Wars of the late 1650s, in which the Haudenosaunee swept south and west against other tribes and territories to expand their hunting grounds for the fur trade. With the help of Maryland's arms, the Susquehannock fought off the Iroquois Confederacy for a time, and a brief peace followed.

In 1658, the Susquehannock used their influence with the Esopus to end the Esopus Wars, because that conflict interfered with important Susquehannock-Dutch trade relations. From 1658 to 1662, the Susquehannock were at war with the powerful Haudenosaunee Confederacy (based south of the Great Lakes) which was seeking new hunting grounds for the fur trade. By 1661, Maryland colonists and the Susquehannock had expanded their peace treaty into a full alliance against the Haudenosaunee Confederacy. Fifty English colonists were assigned to the Susquehannock to guard their fort.

In 1663, the Susquehannock defeated a large Haudenosaunee Confederacy invasion force. In April 1663, the Susquehannock village on the upper Ohio River was attacked by Seneca, Cayuga, and Onondaga warriors of the western Iroquois. (JR: 48:7-79, NYCD 12:431).

In 1669–70, John Lederer was possibly guided by a Susquehannock man on his journey to the southwest Virginia and North Carolina, though the Indian who travelled with him is never named.

Paul A. W. Wallace writes, "In 1669 Iroquois Indians warned the French that if they tried to descend the Ohio River they would be in danger from the 'Andastes'."

In 1672, the Susquehannock defeated another Haudenosaunee Confederacy war party. The Haudenosaunee Confederacy appealed to the French colonial government for support because the Haudenosaunee Confederacy could not "defend themselves if the others came to attack them in their villages".  Some old histories indicate that the Haudenosaunee Confederacy ultimately defeated the Susquehannock, but no record of a defeat has been found. In 1675 the Susquehannock suffered a major defeat by the Haudenosaunee Confederacy. English colonists invited the tribe to resettle in the colony of Maryland, where they relocated. It needs to be noted that this territory was familiar to Susquehannock people because this part of the colony of Maryland was actually the Southern area of the Conestoga Homeland.

The Susquehannock suffered from getting caught up in Bacon's Rebellion the following year. After some Doeg Indians killed some Virginians, surviving colonists crossed into the colony of Maryland and killed Susquehannock in retaliation. A group of Susquehannock moved to a site now known as Susquehannock Fort on Piscataway Creek, below present-day Washington, D. C. Problems on the frontiers led to the mobilization of the militias of the colony of Maryland and the colony of Virginia. In confusion, the colonial militias of Maryland and Virginia surrounded the peaceful Susquehannock village. When five Susquehannock Chiefs came out of their village to negotiate with the colonial militias of Maryland and Virginia, the colonial militias murdered the five Susquehannock Chiefs. The Susquehannock left their own village at night and harassed colonists in the colonies of Virginia and Maryland. The Susquehannock from this village eventually returned to the area of the Susquehanna River.

Covenant Chain Treaty
In 1676 the Haudenosaunee made peace with the colonies of Maryland and Virginia, and the Lenape. When the Susquehannock agreed to the Covenant Chain offered by the Haudenosaunee in 1679, they were offered shelter and many other benefits.

Around 1679, most of the remaining Susquehannock moved to New York, joining mostly with the Seneca and Onondaga nations, who also spoke Iroquoian languages. The Haudenosaunee had a long tradition of adopting defeated enemies into their tribes. Governor Edmund Andros of the colony/Province of New York told the Susquehannock that they would be welcome in the lands of the Haudenosaunee and protected from the colonies of Maryland and Virginia.

Some Susquehannock returned to their homeland on the southern shores of the Susquehanna River, keeping their distance from the center of Iroquois territory. Others moved to the upper Delaware River into the somewhat depopulated Lenape lands where they lived under the protection of the colony of New York.

The Iroquois took control over most of the territory along the Susquehanna River above the Fall Line. Some of the Susquehannock survivors merged with the Meherrin, and allied Nottoway or Mangoac, Iroquoian-speaking tribes located in what were then the colonies of Virginia and North Carolina. The new group called themselves "Chiroenhaka," according to the 20th-century ethnologist James Mooney.

Writing in 2009, Bryan Ward, West Virginia Division of Culture and History, said archeological "sites such as the Mouth of the Seneca (46Pd1) and Pancake Island (46Hm73) have produced evidence of Susquehannock movement into and habitation in the [eastern part of West Virginia]."

The Susquehannock negotiated a treaty with English colonists to enable their settlement in the Conestoga homeland. The Susquehannock chiefs never ceded these lands to Europeans or Americans. According to the Covenant Chain, the Susquehannock were prevented from making any such treaty of cession.

Conestoga Town
The Susquehannock population in their Susquehanna Valley homeland may have declined to as few as about 300 counted persons in 1700. Another remnant group lived to the west in the Allegheny settlement near what is now Conestoga, Pennsylvania; the English colonists called them the Conestoga people.

The Conestoga population had been devastated by high fatalities from new Eurasian infectious diseases, to which they had no immunity, followed by warfare. About 1697, a few hundred Conestoga people settled in a new village called Conestoga Town in what is now known as Lancaster County, Pennsylvania. The river was at that point named the Conestoga River under the colonial governor of the colony of Pennsylvania, Governor William Penn. A type of wagon was named the Conestoga wagon for them; it was later used by pioneers migrating west. Hardware kits for the wagons were made on the east side of the Allegheny Mountains. In the early 1700s, some Conestoga migrated to Ohio, where they merged with other tribes, becoming known as the Mingo.

The Conestoga people at Conestoga Town lived under the protection of the provincial Pennsylvania government, but their population declined steadily. In 1763, a census counted 22 people in Conestoga Town. That year the Paxton Boys, in response to Pontiac's Rebellion on the western side of the Allegheny Mountains, attacked Conestoga Town (which was located on the eastern side of the Allegheny Mountains and had nothing to do with Pontiac's war of resistance to European colonial encroachment). They killed six people.

The remaining Conestoga inhabitants of Conestoga Town were sheltered in a Lancaster workhouse by the colonial government of Pennsylvania. The colonial governor discouraged further violence, but two weeks later, the Paxton Boys raided the town and killed the 14 Conestoga people staying at the workhouse. The tribe and their language were considered extinct. 

However, a modern discovery of a 1768 deed shows that the Penn family paid "the surviving relations of Sohaes" $300 for the 500 acres of Conestoga Manor (including Indian Town).

The last two known Conestoga from Conestoga Town, a couple named Michael and Mary, were sheltered from the massacre on a farm near Manheim, Pennsylvania. Their burial site on what is now Kreider farms is in the Historical Marker Database, listed as part of Kreider Homestead.

19th century 
In 1845, records discussed in a 1993 newspaper article show six Conestoga descendants living in New York had employed attorney Peter Doxtater to obtain restitution for land that had originally belonged to their ancestors in York county. They are named as Chris John Beachtree, Jacob Powlis, David Johnson, Chris John, and James Chris John. In 1868, Peter Doxtater turned over all legal negotiations to Christian Shenk, an attorney in Lancaster county, Pennsylvania. These records can be accessed in the Lancaster County archives

20th century
In 1941 a bill was introduced by Ray E. Taylor and William E. Habbyshaw to provide a reservation for the remaining Susquehannock in Dauphin County, Pennsylvania. It made arrangements for tribal members to lease land for a nominal fee and establish a central community in their historic homelands. Under the provisions of the bill, the tract of land would have been called "The Susquehannock Indian Reservation". While this appropriation bill for $20,000 was passed unopposed in the state legislature, it would be later vetoed by Governor Arthur James, who believed the last Susquehannock tribal member had died in 1763.

21st century
Descendants of partial Susquehannock ancestry "may be included among today's Seneca-Cayuga Tribe of Oklahoma."

Society

The Susquehannock society was a confederacy of up to 20 smaller tribes, who occupied scattered villages along the Susquehanna River. They likely had clans, as did other Iroquoian-speaking tribes, as the basis for their societies, and were a matrilineal kinship culture. Children were considered born to the mother's family and gained social status from her clan. Property and inherited positions passed through her line.

The Susquehannock remained independent and not part of any other confederacy into the 1670s. Ultimately, they were not strong enough to withstand the competition from colonists and other nations in their piece of the so-called Beaver Wars of that century. About 1677 many Susquehannock people, decimated by new infectious diseases and warfare, assimilated with their former enemies, the Five Nations of the Haudenosaunee (Iroquois), who were also Iroquoian speaking. They primarily occupied territory south of the Great Lakes in what is now New York State. In effect, the Haudenosaunee became the successor government to the Susquehannock. They took over the latter's territory.

Susquehannock people lived in longhouses as did the Haudenosaunee. The Susquehannock villages were palisaded so that enemies could not easily attack the village longhouses. Corn was such an important crop that John Campanius Holm recorded the Susquehannock word for it. The Susquehannock kept dogs, as indicated by Holm's record. Other important animals for the Susquehannock were turkey, deer, bear, beaver, otter, foxes, and elk. As is seen in the depiction of the Susquehannock man above, men went to war with bows and arrows, and war clubs.  The vocabulary written by Holm includes words specifically meaning "smoking tobacco", as well as the word for "pipe for smoking tobacco". These indicate that tobacco smoking was an important part of Susquehannock ritual. The cut of the hair of the Susquehannock man pictured shows a hairstyle similar but different from that of the Haudenosaunee.

Travel was both on water and on land. On the water, it was via canoe. Several place names indicate locations where a portage was needed between river or stream sections.  The main thoroughfare would have been what is today called the Susquehanna River. The length and navigability of this river via canoe would have allowed the Susquehannock to be a powerful regional force and to have strong internal trade routes between sub-tribes and clans.  The Susquehanna River is navigable by canoe from near its source in what is now New York to its mouth in the Chesapeake Bay.  The location of the Conestoga Homeland indicates that the Susquehannock language likely contained words for mountains, river features, land animals, plants, fish, coastal species, as well as for the land that was flat. The Pennsylvania Bison was likely hunted by the Susquehannock. Breaks in the mountain range would have allowed for over-land travel via well-worn trails. Most travel would likely have been inside of the valleys between the ridges. This would have meant that the Susquehannock had access to trade from what is now the Southeast of the United States via the valley systems.  This would mean that the Susquehannock could have traded with the Cherokee directly since the Cherokee were directly South of the Conestoga Homeland.  The Cherokee are another Iroquoian people and it is possible that the languages were not hard for one or the other Nation to learn.

Susquehannock society would have been affected and defined by its location. When viewed in a pre-Colonial context, the homelands of the Nations of the Haudenosaunee Confederacy are directly to the North of the Conestoga Homeland. To the South in the Appalachian mountain and valley ranges were the Cherokee, another Iroquoian-speaking people.

Susquehannock villages were likely traditionally built on top of ridges of the Appalachian Mountains when such ridges were available. The Susquehannock site in what is now Sayre, Pennsylvania is evidence for this. At this site was likely a religious complex, known currently as Spanish Hill.  Spanish Hill is possibly an artificial hill, and possibly natural. Research is still being conducted regarding this issue.  Building on the ridges would have allowed the Susquehannock to view from the safety of their villages the surrounding area, which was likely used for farming of corn, beans, and squash.  This pattern of using the land near the rivers and streams for farming has been found in many Native American societies in the East of Turtle Island (North America).  Building villages on ridge tops would have allowed the Susquehannock to observe advancing enemy movements and to be safe in times of flood.  The Susquehannock lived in settled villages and were not known to be nomadic.  The Conestoga Homeland is the most flood-prone area of the East of Turtle Island, owing to the number of rivers and their tributaries.  The Susquehannock likely practiced sylvan agriculture like the other Native Nations of the East of Turtle Island.  Nuts and berries would have been harvested from the forest and mushrooms would probably have been harvested as well.  Harvest time for many berries and nuts can be ascertained from the current wild availability of the berries and nuts in the Conestoga Homeland.  Harvest time for corn, beans, and squash was likely late Summer until early Fall.  Following the normal seasonal festival/religious patterns of other Iroquois people, the Susquehannock most likely followed a seasonal calendar of planting, harvest, and Winter festivals.

Dreams were likely important to Susquehannock people. All other Iroquoian peoples put great stock in dreams and the Susquehannock are likely to have thought dreams to be important too.
 
Archeological materials have been found in Pennsylvania and Maryland's Allegany County at the Barton (18AG3) and Llewellyn (18AG26) sites. West Virginia's Grant, Hampshire and Hardy counties region (Brashler 1987) also have archaeological sites where Susquehannock ceramics have been found.

Archeologists have also found evidence of Susquehannock people along the Potomac River and its tributaries. They have classified these artifacts as the "late Susquehannock sequence". A Contact Period (1550~1630) Susquehanna site, (46Hy89), is located in the Eastern Panhandle at Moorefield, West Virginia.

Legacy
Places have been named for the historic tribe:
Susquehannock State Park in Pennsylvania
Susquehannock High School of Southern York, Pennsylvania.
Toponyms of the Conestoga homeland reflect place names from the Susquehannock/Conestoga language.

A graphic novel, documentary, and teaching material, under the title Ghost River, a project of the Library Company of Philadelphia and supported by The Pew Center for Arts & Heritage, addresses the Paxton massacres of 1763 and provides "interpreters and new bodies of evidence to highlight the Indigenous victims and their kin."

Iroquoian Peoples
 Susquehannock
 Akhrakouaeronon
 Cherokee
 Chonnonton
 Erie
 Huron
 Haudenosaunee Confederacy/Iroquois
 Meherrin
 Mohawk
 Petun (See also Protohistory of West Virginia )
 Tuscarora (Also Nottoway )

Important Treaties

Covenant Chain

Footnotes

References

Brinton, Daniel G. and the Rev. Albert S. Anthony. Lenâpe-English Dictionary. From an Anonymous MS. in the Archives of the Moravian Church at Bethlehem, PA. Philadelphia, PA: The Historical Society of PA, 1888.
Eshleman, H.F., Lancaster County Indians: Annals of the Susquehannocks and Other Indian Tribes of the Susquehanna Territory from about the Year 1500 to 1763, the Date of Their Extinction. An Exhaustive and Interesting Series of Historical Papers Descriptive of Lancaster County's Indians, Express Print Company (Princeton University reprint), 1909.
Guss, A.L., Early Indian history on the Susquehanna: Based on rare and original documents, L.S. Hart printer (Harvard reprint), 1883.

Illick, Joseph E. Colonial Pennsylvania: a History. New York: Scribner & Sons, 1976.
Jennings, Francis, The Ambiguous Iroquois Empire, New York: W.W. Norton & Company, 1984, ISBN 0-393-01719-2
Kent, Barry C. Susquehanna's Indians. Harrisburg: The Pennsylvania Historical and Museum Commission, 1984.
Raber, Paul A. The Susquehannocks: New Perspectives on Settlement and Cultural Identity, 
Pennsylvania State University Press, 2019 - Excavations (Archaeology) 

Wallace, Paul A. W. Indians in Pennsylvania. 2nd ed. Harrisburg: The Pennsylvania Historical and Museum Commission, 1981.
Witthoft, John, Susquehannock miscellany, Pennsylvania Historical and Museum Commission, 1959.

External links

"Where are the Susquehannock?" at The Susquehannock Fire Ring
"Susquehannock History" by Lee Sultzman
Encyclopedia of Oklahoma History and Culture - Conestoga
Susquehannock State Park
Native Lands Park, York County, Pennsylvania

 
Iroquoian peoples
Indigenous peoples of the Northeastern Woodlands
Native American history of Maryland
Native American history of New York (state)
Native American history of Pennsylvania
Native American history of West Virginia
Chesapeake Bay
Extinct Native American tribes
Potomac River
Native American tribes in Maryland
Native American tribes in Pennsylvania
Native American tribes in West Virginia
Algonquian ethnonyms